Xylophanes fassli is a moth of the  family Sphingidae.

Distribution 
It is known from Bolivia.

Description 
It is similar to Xylophanes rothschildi, but the discal spot on the forewing upperside is larger, the deeper olive-green shading at the base is absent and the darker green oval patch distal to the discal spot is smaller. The pink coloration of the fringe of the inner margin from the base to the postmedian line is visible only on close examination or with the use of a magnifying glass.

Biology 
The larvae probably feed on Rubiaceae and Malvaceae species.

References

fassli
Moths described in 1928
Endemic fauna of Bolivia
Moths of South America